The 1985 Texas–Arlington Mavericks football team was an American football team that represented the University of Texas at Arlington in the Southland Conference during the 1985 NCAA Division I-AA football season. In their second year under head coach Chuck Curtis, the team compiled a 4–6–1 record. At the conclusion of the season on November 25, UTA President Wendell Nedderman announced the football program was to be discontinued citing financial concerns.

Schedule

References

Texas–Arlington
Texas–Arlington Mavericks football seasons
Texas–Arlington Mavericks football